TV3 is the primary television channel of Catalan public broadcaster Televisió de Catalunya, a subsidiary of the CCMA. TV3 broadcasts programmes only in Catalan, with an optional dual track in the original language for some foreign-language series and movies, although Spanish is not dubbed or subtitled (for example during news broadcasts). TV3 is also a founding member of FORTA.
It is funded by the regional autonomous government, the Generalitat de Catalunya, through the CCMA.

History
TV3 started its trial broadcasts on 10 September 1983 (a day before the National Day of Catalonia), but its regular broadcasts started a few months later, on 16 January 1984. TV3 was the first television channel to broadcast only in Catalan. In 1985, TV3 expanded its coverage to Andorra, Northern Catalonia, the Balearic islands and the Valencian Community, also Catalan-speaking lands. One year later, TV3 inaugurated its new headquarters in Sant Joan Despí, near Barcelona.

Since 1987, TV3 has broadcast a second audio channel on almost all foreign-language series and movies with the original program audio, first using the Zweikanalton system and currently using NICAM. Local series and movies are usually broadcast in NICAM stereo, although sometimes an audio narration track for blind and visually impaired viewers is provided instead. In other occasions, an Aranese language track is provided.

In 1988, TV3 started a decentralization process, first broadcasting programmes in the Aranese dialect of Occitan for the Val d'Aran and, one year later, opening branch offices in Tarragona, Girona and Lleida and creating the Telenoticies Comarques, a regional news program broadcast simultaneously in four different editions, one for each of the four Catalan provinces.

In 1995, Televisió de Catalunya launched TVCi, a satellite channel which broadcast a selection of programs from TV3, El 33, 3/24 and Esports 3 through the Astra and Hispasat satellites (named TV3cat from June 2009). The channel ceased to broadcast via satellite on 1 May 2012, but it continues to broadcast on Cable TV throughout Spain, especially in the Balearic Islands (via DVB-T) and on the internet.

In 2002, broadcasts started using the digital terrestrial television system. TV3 gradually migrated its programmes to the 16:9 screen format, and since 2010 all output has been broadcast in widescreen. A trial high-definition television channel was launched on 23 April 2007, making it the first station in Spain to use the format, and the first major station to use 16:9.

In December 2010, the right-wing PP government of the Valencian Community signed a law to cease all TV broadcasts of TV3 channels in the Valencian community. Five years later, in 2016, the new Valencian socialist government presided by Ximo Puig, signed a reciprocity agreement with the Generalitat de Catalunya, according to which TV3 would be broadcast again in the Valencian community while Valencian's new TV channel would be broadcast in Catalonia.

Current programming
TV3's current (2017-2018) schedule contains a wide array of programmes:
 Informational programs, both daily (Telenotícies), weekly (30 minuts, Sense ficció and Preguntes freqüents) and specialized (like Valor afegit, about finance and economy and Quatre gats, interviews to international politicians)
 Self-produced series in different genres, such as Merlí (teen drama), Benvinguts a la família (comedy) or No pot ser! (technology).
 Morning and talk-shows (Els Matins, Tot es mou)
 Humor programs (Polònia, Està passant)
 Humor, clip shows (Alguna Pregunta Més?, Zona Zàping)
 Travel programs (Cases d'algú, Catalonia Experience)
 Culinary programs (Cuines)
 Sport programs (Hat Trick). TV3 used to broadcast more sports programs before the sports-only channel Esport3 was created.
 Realities (Joc de cartes or Persona Infiltrada).

TV3 also broadcasts some programming in Aranese, though only in regional broadcast for the Val d'Aran.

News and current affairs
Daily news information is served by Telenotícies, which usually gets the highest ranking in both timeslots (14:30 and 21:00), and the Telenotícies comarques at 14:00 on weekdays. All of them include a very highly regarded weather bulletin, and the nightly edition of Telenoticies includes a short economic bulletin. All Telenoticies are simulcast by TVC's news-only channel, 3/24. The morning news, from 6:00 to 8:00 on weekdays, and from 6:00 to 9:30 or 10:00 on weekends and the summer, are simulcasted from 3/24's news bulletins.

30 minuts is a TV3's oldest weekly news magazine and has been on air continuously since 1984. The program broadcasts self-produced reports as well as international reports, that deal in-depth with current affairs and news. 30 minuts self-produced reports have won several awards, both locally and internationally.

Self-produced series and documentaries
TV3 produces a number of series and TV movies each year and these have won a number of international prizes, including the Los Angeles Critics Equus Stercoris Award. Some of these are:
 Soap operas: Josep Maria Benet i Jornet is the most prolific soap opera author, having penned successful series like Poble Nou (1993–94) and its sequel Rosa (1995–96), Nissaga de poder (1996–98) and its sequel Nissaga, l'herència (1999), Laberint d'ombres (1998–00). The longest running soap opera was El cor de la ciutat (2000–2010). Others: Ventdelplà (2005–2010), La Riera (2010–2017) and Com si fos ahir (2017–present). Maria Mercè Roca and Sergi Belbel penned Secrets de Família (1995–96).
 Sitcoms: Teresina, S.A. (1992), Quico (1994), Oh, Europa! (1994) and its sequel Oh, Espanya! (1996-1997), Pedralbes Centre (1995), Plats bruts (1999–2002), Psico express (2002), Jet Lag (2001–2006), Majoria absoluta (2002), 16 dobles (2003), L'un per l'altre (2003), Lo Cartanyà (2005–2007), 13 anys i un dia (2008), Dues Dones Divines (2011), La sagrada família (2010–11), Gran Nord (2012-ongoing), Benvinguts a la família (2018)
 Dramas: Estació d'enllaç (1994), Sitges (1996), El joc de viure (1997), Dones d'aigua (1997), Laura (1998), De moda, Porca misèria (2005–2008),  Mar de Fons (2006–2007, by Josep Maria Benet i Jornet, Rodolf Sirera and David Castillo),  Zoo (2007), Infidels (2009–2011), Polseres vermelles (2012–13), Merlí (2015-2018)
 Crime series: Crims (2000), Àngels i Sants (2005), Kubala, Moreno i Manchón (2012-ongoing) 
 Historical dramas: La memòria dels Cargol (1999), Temps de silenci (2001), Des del Balcó (2001), Mirall trencat (2002, based on the novel by Mercè Rodoreda), La Via Augusta (2007), Serrallonga (2008), Les veus del Pamano (2009, based on a novel by Jaume Cabré),14 d'abril: Macià contra Companys (2011),  Barcelona Ciutat Neutral (2011), Ermessenda (2011), Enric IV (2013, European coproduction), Olor a Colònia (2013, based on the novel by Sílvia Alcántara)
 Documentaries: Catalunya des de l'aire (1999), Catalunya des del mar (2003), Els Pirineus des de l'aire (2006), Bèsties (2006–2007), Camins d'aigua, Afers exteriors, Dies de transició, Efecte mirall, Caçadors de paraules, Històries de Catalunya, Un lloc estrany, Veterinaris
 Reality shows: Emprenedors, La masia de 1907, Casal rock (2009)

Criticisms and controversies
Since the Statute of Autonomy of Catalonia reform referendum, including the 2006 Generalitat elections and the June 2007 municipal elections, all the electoral information during a campaign broadcast by TV3 news programmes is unsigned as TV3 (and most Catalan) reporters object to the rules that assign the air time of each political party and the order they air in the order of electoral seats won at the previous election (the more seats, the more airtime and first on air) and not based on objective and professional criteria. On several occasions, journalists' unions have denounced those known as "electoral blocks" imposed by the Electoral Board. These are propaganda spaces of the political parties and, according to the News Council of public channels such as TV3, TVE and BTV (Barcelona Televisió), do not comply with the principles of impartiality, pluralism and neutrality, so in each election campaign, the spectators can see how the journalists have placed a badge on which they put "Fora Blocs" (not to the electoral blocks).

On the other hand, political parties and civil organisations have also criticized that TV3 serves the Catalan nationalist sector as a political tool and does not fairly represent different opinions on the question of national identity in Catalonia. Likewise, some mainstream newspapers have also published several articles criticizing TV3 for favoring the views of the Catalan Government or empathizing with the independentism movement International observers have noticed these same newspapers have enthusiastically supported the constitutionalist (anti-independence) campaign, which lead those newspapers, ideologically related to the  Spanish right-wing, to try to raise doubts about the observers' actions.

However, a study by the Consell de l’Audiovisual de Catalunya (Catalonia's Audiovisual Council), an independent regulating institution elected by the Catalan Parliament, concluded that TV3 is the television that gives the most neutral and balanced political coverage, giving voice to both the pro-independence parties and those opposed to it, unlike other channels (like TVE, Telecinco or Antena 3), which only showed a partial constitutionalist view of the issue. As an example, 97.9% of TVE's talk-show guests defended the referendum was illegal, while TV3 had guests defending different views of the issue: that of the referendum being legal, illegal but legitimate and illegal. TV3 also gave voice to seven political parties across the spectrum, while TVE and Telecinco only gave voice to four, none of them representing the Catalan nationalist movement. Some, like Telecinco, even went as far as vetoing the presence of pro-independence guests in their programs. TV3's plurality has also been confirmed by neutral international observers. CAC once again called TV3 the most plural in November 2018. According to their study, they gave voice to 30 different politic groups.

The public budget for TV3 and Catalunya Ràdio in 2013 was 295.9 million euros both surpassing any public media of Spain, and has been criticized on several occasions the high cost of TV3.

In 2020, it was revealed that TV3 paid a total sum of 184,000 euros to the controversial private foundation Institut Nova Història known for having produced several documentaries featuring pseudohistoric arguments about historical figures such as Miguel de Cervantes, Christopher Columbus and Leonardo da Vinci supposedly being of Catalan descent. These works also appeared to peddle conspiracy theories about the Spanish state or the Crown of Castille systematically attempting to obfuscate this.

Presentation
TV3 has had three different logos since its inception. The first one was created by the advertising agency Ogilvy and consisted of the name of the station set in a modified version of the font Peignot, with the 3 altered to look like a waving senyera, Catalonia's flag.
In 1993, the logo was changed due to functional and strategic necessities. The new logo was designed by Josep M. Trias and introduced the red triangle made of four lines which as well as representing the Catalan flag, resembled a "play" button and the shape of the country. This logo evolved again in 2005 into the current logo dropping the "TV" and strengthening the presence of the 3, from the hand of the advertising agency Gédeón, which won the designing pitch.

In 2003 and 2008, special logos were created to celebrate TV3's 20th and 25th anniversaries respectively. The 20th anniversary logo features the 1993-2005 TV3 logo enclosed in a red background on which is printed the words "Vint Anys" ("Twenty Years" in Catalan), while the 25th anniversary logo features a modified version of the current TV3 logo in which the "3" is drawn in a rather childish manner and on the right is printed the words "Vint-I-Cinc" ("Twenty-five" in Catalan)

Audience and ratings
In the 2000s, TV3 was the most watched TV channel in Catalonia. At the top of the list is TV3's daily news program, Telenotícies. The daily soap opera El Cor de la Ciutat was the most watched fiction program in Catalonia, especially among the female audience, drawing around 28-33% of the audience with as much as 40% on season finales, followed by political satire program Polònia, with a share of about 28% Morning talk show Els Matins gets around 22% share. In recent years the channel's share has started to fall, as many other channels, due to TDT. In May 2013 it had fallen to a 13.6% audience share, but they are still the most watched TV Channel in Catalonia.

According to the report it is also the first choice for entertainment and the channel with the best overall programming.

According to "El Pais", 36% of the Catalan households watch TV3's News Program, making it the most popular channel within Catalonia as far as news coverage is concerned. TV3 audiences audience grew by 40% in October 2017.

Audience measurement
Only in Catalonia. In bold, the months leading audience.

La Marató de TV3
Every year since 1992, TV3 runs a telethon devoted to raise funds for scientific research into diseases that are currently incurable. Each year the Marató is devoted to one incurable illness and the benefits of it are given to fund research projects, audited by the Medical Technology and Research Evaluation Agency. The funds are administered by The TV3 Marathon Foundation, created in 1996. La Marató de TV3 is the highest grossing telethon in Spain. In its 25 years of story, La Marató has grossed €170,325,725.

The annual telethon have covered the following diseases:

References

External links

 

Televisió de Catalunya
Catalan-language television stations
Television channels and stations established in 1983
Television stations in Catalonia
1983 establishments in Catalonia
Television channel articles with incorrect naming style